The Silas Riggs House is a historic house built  by Silas Riggs (1779–1847) in the Ledgewood section of  Roxbury Township, Morris County, New Jersey. The house was moved to its current location in 1962. It was added to the National Register of Historic Places on November 11, 1977, for its significance in architecture and community history. It was later added as a contributing property to the Ledgewood Historic District on April 18, 2013.

See also
 List of museums in New Jersey
 National Register of Historic Places listings in Morris County, New Jersey

References

External links
 
  curator of museums at Drakesville Historic Park

Roxbury Township, New Jersey
National Register of Historic Places in Morris County, New Jersey
Historic district contributing properties in New Jersey
Historic district contributing properties in Morris County, New Jersey
Individually listed contributing properties to historic districts on the National Register in New Jersey
New Jersey Register of Historic Places
Houses on the National Register of Historic Places in New Jersey
Houses in Morris County, New Jersey
1805 establishments in New Jersey
Museums in Morris County, New Jersey